Gustaf Ising (or Gustav Ising in some publications), (19 February 1883 in Finja – 5 February 1960 in Danderyd), was a Swedish accelerator physicist and geophysicist.

Biography
Ising earned his first academic degree (filosofie kandidat/Bachelor of Arts) at Uppsala University in 1903 and continued studying at Stockholm University receiving his Ph.D. in 1919, and receiving an honorary professor title in 1934.

He is best known for the invention of the linear accelerator concept in 1924, which is the progenitor of all modern accelerators based on oscillating electromagnetic fields. His article was then taken up and turned into practice by Rolf Widerøe, also starting the development of cyclic accelerator structures like the cyclotron.

He was elected to the Swedish Academy of Sciences in 1935, being a member of the Nobel Committee for Physics from 1947 to 1953, together with former Nobel laureate and chairman Manne Siegbahn, Svante Arrhenius, Erik Hulthen, Axel Edvin Lindh, Ivar Waller, and Gudmund Borelius.

References 

Swedish physicists
Experimental physicists
Accelerator physicists
1883 births
1960 deaths